The men's tournament in the 2019 Rugby League World Cup 9s was held at Bankwest Stadium in Sydney on 18 and 19 October 2019.

Group stage

Pool A

Pool B

Pool C

Knockout stage

Semi-finals

Final

See also
 2019 Rugby League World Cup 9s – Women's tournament

References

Rugby League World Cup 9s
2019 in Australian rugby league